Ihor Vyacheslavovych Sorkin (Ihor Vyacheslavovych Sorkin) is a former chairman of the National Bank of Ukraine.

Biography

Early years. Military career
Igor Sorkin was born on March 3, 1967, in Donetsk. He graduated from high school in 1984. In 1988–1996 he served in the Soviet Army and the National Guard of Ukraine (commander landing assault platoon, reconnaissance battalion and regimental intelligence chief of the National Guard).

Education
Ihor Sorkin has three higher educations:
in 1988 he graduated from the Baku Higher Combined-Arms Command School with a degree in "Engineer"
in 1998 he graduated from Donetsk State University with a degree in "Law"
in 2006 he graduated from Donetsk National University with a degree in "Banking"

Career in the National Bank of Ukraine
Since 1996 he has been working in the system of the National Bank of Ukraine (economist of 1st category, leading economist, chief economist at the department, head of the sector, deputy head of the department, since 2001 - head of Banking Supervision department in Office of the National Bank of Ukraine in the Donetsk Oblast)
In July 2010 he was appointed deputy governor of the National Bank of Ukraine
Since January 17, 2011 - the 3d ranking civil servant.
From December 2012 - acting governor of the National Bank of Ukraine
On January 11, 2013, he was appointed governor of the National Bank of Ukraine by Verkhovna Rada of Ukraine after being proposed by President Viktor Yanukovych.
Since January 18, 2013 - member of National Security and Defense Council of Ukraine.

On 24 February 2014, just after the "Maidan revolution", the Verkhovna Rada dismissed Sorkin as governor of the National Bank of Ukraine.

On 17 March 2014 the Kiev Pechersky District Court approved the arrest Sorkin in absentia on suspicion of embezzlement.

Family
Sorkin's parents live in Moscow, Russia. Where his father Vyacheslav Sorkin is an executive of Gazprom.

Sorkin's wife Anzhela is a former executive of UkrBusinessBank. The head of the board of this bank was Sorkins predecessor as national bank governor Serhiy Arbuzov; while UkrBusinessBank was owned by Oleksandr Yanukovych who is the son of president Viktor Yanukovych at the time of the appointment of Sorkin as national bank governor.

State awards
Merited Economist of Ukraine (since December 1, 2011)

References

External links
Mr. Mykola Azarov and Mr. Sergiy Arbuzov introduce a new Governor of the National Bank of Ukraine
Ihor Sorkin new governor of the National Bank of Ukraine
Prime Minister introduces Sorkin to NBU personnel

Governors of the National Bank of Ukraine
1967 births
Living people
Businesspeople from Donetsk
Donetsk National University alumni
21st-century Ukrainian economists
20th-century Ukrainian economists